The African grey flycatcher, grayish flycatcher, or large flycatcher (Melaenornis microrhynchus) is a passerine bird in the Old World flycatcher family Muscicapidae that occurs in parts of East Africa.

Taxonomy

The African grey flycatcher was previously placed in the genus Bradornis but was moved to Melaenornis based on the results of a molecular phylogenetic study published in 2010. The subspecies M. m. pumilus is sometimes considered a full species, the Ethiopian grey flycatcher (Melaenornis pumilus).

Distribution and habitat
It is found in Ethiopia, Kenya, Somalia, South Sudan, Tanzania, and Uganda.  Its natural habitats are dry savanna and subtropical or tropical dry shrubland.

References

African grey flycatcher
African grey flycatcher
Birds of East Africa
Birds of the Horn of Africa
African grey flycatcher
Taxonomy articles created by Polbot
Taxobox binomials not recognized by IUCN